Tarat is a state constituency in Sarawak, Malaysia, that has been represented in the Sarawak State Legislative Assembly since 1969.

The state constituency was created in the 1968 redistribution and is mandated to return a single member to the Sarawak State Legislative Assembly under the first past the post voting system.

History
2006–2016: The constituency contains the polling districts of Tijirak, Batu Gong, Simpuk, Sekuduk, Anah Rais, Panchor, Pekan Tarat, Baki, Ampungan, Tapah, Petung, Tabuan Rabak, Mundai, Beratok, Pesang, Gayu, Sarig, Sira, Teng Bukap, Subang, Stabut, Peraya, Maang, Merakep, Bisira, Dunuk, Semaru, Belimbing, Sepit, Kiding, Simuti, Maras, Sadir, Pengkalan Ampat, Retoh, Sungai Barie, Tarat Baru, Munggu Lalang, Rayang, Sebemban, Tanah Puteh.

2016–present: The constituency contains the polling districts of Tijirak, Petung, Tabuan Rabak, Simpuk, Sekuduk, Panchor, Pekan Tarat, Bayur, Bandar Baru Bayur, Baki, Ampungan, Tapah, Mundai, Beratok, Pesang, Gayu, Sarig, Sira, Teng Bukap, Subang, Stabut, Peraya, Maang, Merakep, Bisira, Dunuk, Semaru, Belimbing, Retoh, Sungai Barie, Tarat Baru, Munggu Lalang, Rayang, Sebemban, Tanah Puteh.

Representation history

Election results

References

Sarawak state constituencies